Jennifer M. Short is a United States Air Force brigadier general who serves as the Deputy Director for Strategic Planning and Policy of the United States Indo-Pacific Command. Previously, she was the Chief of Staff of the Pacific Air Forces.

In May 2022, Short was nominated for promotion to major general.

References

External links
 

Year of birth missing (living people)
Living people
Place of birth missing (living people)
United States Air Force generals